The Lloyd LT 500 was a compact van produced and sold by the German automaker Borgward Groups's Lloyd Motoren Werke GmbH (Lloyd Motor Works) in Bremen, Germany between 1953 and 1957. A six seater minivan version was offered by April 1954.

Its appearance resembles a van version of the Fiat 500, but that impression is misleading.

The LT 500 featured a two cylinder two stroke engine of 386 cc, which claimed a power output of 13 hp. It had a 6V starter battery and electric. Its fuel consumption was specified to 5.7 l/100 km (41 mpg). The steering, springing and, in particular, the three-speed gear box without synchromesh on any ratio attracted criticism even by the standards of 1953. Interior comfort was also let down by insufficient heating and lack of ventilation possibilities also attracted criticism. The ease with which seats in the minivan could be removed to convert the vehicle to a load carrier impressed the journalists, however.

855 Pickups, 357 panel vans, and 8,688 minibus versions had been produced by the time the LT 500 was replaced by the 596 cc LT 600.

The Lloyd LT 600 was an engine upgraded Lloyd LT 500, which was built between 1955 and 1961. The slightly larger four stroke engine and the unsynchronized transmission were later used in the passenger car Lloyd 600 which was also a variation of the modell Alexander making the van take 6 l/100 km (39 mpg) of fuel consumption.

11,249 vans and 3519 other body variations have been produced until 1961, the year as Borgward disappeared with all its brands from the markets.

See also
DKW Schnellaster
Tempo Matador

Sources and further reading

LT 500
Vehicles introduced in 1952
Front-wheel-drive vehicles
Minivans
Vans
Minibuses
Pickup trucks
Cars introduced in 1952